No Love for Johnnie by Wilfred Fienburgh, was first published in 1959 by Hutchinson. Essentially a political novel it deals with the life of Johnny Byrne, a cynical and burnt-out politician whose career has ostensibly stalled due to his leftist leanings in a conservative Labour government. It was made into a film in 1961, directed by Ralph Thomas.

Overview
Stylistically the novel belongs to the genre associated with John Osborne, John Braine, Shelagh Delaney and other realist writers who were to find their voices in the new wave of British "verismo" art forms. The narrative allows the reader to examine the internal conflicts that Johnnie Byrne negotiates as he attempts to find some merit in his desultory existence.
 
Under scrutiny are his relationships with his cold, politically driven wife, Alice, whose own politics are a point of contention for Johnnie. His neighbour, Mary and the young woman, Pauline illuminate Byrne's darker aspects.  As a piece of literature it may be considered light weight but re-readings will reveal a tight structure and a credible analysis of the way powerful individuals, the makers of social change, are paradoxically vulnerable ciphers in a world where they too may be ill-served by cupidity.
 
Even though the weak ending of his relationship with a much younger woman may seem clichéd and trite by twenty-first century standards, it is handled with a certain amount of legerdemain and irony so that it escapes being trite. 
There is a sense that Byrne lands on his feet by his very own inaction in political matters. By the novel's end, it is clear that Byrne himself has failed to influence his own life. and appears to be a pawn at the mercy of events around him.

1959 British novels
British novels adapted into films
British political novels
Hutchinson (publisher) books